Tell Feyda on the right bank of the Khabur River is an archaeological site in northern Syria. The material remains date to the pre-pottery neolithic and the site was excavated in 1990.

References 

Neolithic sites
Former populated places in Syria
Neolithic sites in Syria
Archaeological sites in al-Hasakah Governorate
Tells (archaeology)
Upper Mesopotamia